This is a list of cities in Indonesia by gross domestic product (GDP) according to the Statistics Indonesia. These figures were estimated in the year 2021.

Methodology 
GRP Nominal is the regional or provincial counterpart of the national gross domestic product, the most comprehensive measure of national economic activity. The Statistics Indonesia (Badan Pusat Statistik) derives GRP for a province as the sum of the GRP Nominal originating in all the industries in the province at current prices market.

List of Indonesian cities by GDP Nominal and PPP, with 14,308 IDR = US$1 term of Nominal while 4,833.87 IDR = US$1 term of PPP.

2021 data

List Indonesian Metropolitan City by GDP 2021

List Indonesian City Proper by GDP 2021

See also 
 Economy of Indonesia
 List of Indonesian provinces by GDP
 List of Indonesian provinces by GRP per capita
 List of Indonesian provinces by Human Development Index

References 

Indonesia
gdp per capita, cities
GDP per capita
Provinces of Indonesia by GRP per capita
Indonesia